Delone M. Carter (born June 22, 1987) is a former American football running back. He played college football at Syracuse and was drafted by the Indianapolis Colts in the fourth round of the 2011 NFL Draft. Prior to college, Carter played for the Copley Indians at Copley High School.

College career
Carter rushed for 1,233 yards on 231 carries and nine touchdowns as a senior. He was named the MVP of the 2010 Pinstripe Bowl after rushing for 198 yards on 27 carries and two touchdowns. He was also the offensive MVP of the 2011 East–West Shrine Game. Carter currently ranks third on the Syracuse all-time rushing yards list with 3,104.

College statistics

Professional career

Indianapolis Colts
Carter was selected by the Indianapolis Colts with 119th overall pick in the 2011 NFL Draft. Prior to the draft, he was considered one of the better running back prospects for the 2011 NFL Draft.  During his rookie season, he rushed 101 times for 377 yards, and 2 touchdowns.

Baltimore Ravens
On August 21, 2013, the Indianapolis Colts traded Carter to the Baltimore Ravens for wide receiver David Reed. He was cut by the Ravens on August 30, 2013.

Jacksonville Jaguars
Carter was signed by the Jacksonville Jaguars on December 9, 2013. He was released on May 12, 2014.

References

External links
Syracuse Orange bio

1987 births
Living people
Players of American football from Akron, Ohio
American football running backs
Syracuse Orange football players
Indianapolis Colts players
Baltimore Ravens players
Jacksonville Jaguars players